Protein phosphatase 1F is an enzyme that in humans is encoded by the PPM1F gene.

The protein encoded by this gene is a member of the PP2C family of Ser/Thr protein phosphatases. PP2C family members are known to be negative regulators of cell stress response pathways. This phosphatase can interact with Rho guanine nucleotide exchange factors (PIX), and thus block the effects of p21-activated kinase 1 (PAK), a protein kinase mediating biological effects downstream of Rho GTPases. Calcium/calmodulin-dependent protein kinase II gamma (CAMK2G/CAMK-II) is found to be one of the substrates of this phosphatase. The overexpression of this phosphatase or CAMK2G has been shown to mediate caspase-dependent apoptosis. An alternatively spliced transcript variant has been identified, but its full-length nature has not been determined.

References

Further reading